The Archdeacon of Craven was a senior ecclesiastical officer within the Diocese of Bradford. The final archdeacon was Paul Slater.

As an Archdeacon, he or she was responsible for the disciplinary supervision of the clergy within four area deaneries: Bowland, Ewecross, Skipton and South Craven. The archdeaconry was erected, part of the new Diocese of Ripon, on 5 October 1836 by Order in Council under the Established Church Act 1836 and transferred to the Diocese of Bradford upon that diocese's creation on 25 November 1919. Upon the creation of the Diocese of Leeds on 20 April 2014, the archdeaconry was dissolved and its territory added to the Richmond archdeaconry; Slater was automatically transferred (by the legislation) to the newly-renamed post of Archdeacon of Richmond and Craven.

List of archdeacons
30 December 1836 – 17 April 1875 (d.): Charles Musgrave (first archdeacon)
1875–1880 (res.): Vincent Ryan
1880–1893: William Boyd
1893–1913 (res.): Francis Kilner
1913–1928 (d.): Lucas Cook
On 25 November 1919, the archdeaconry was transferred to the new Bradford diocese.
1928–1934 (d.): James Howson
1934–1949 (ret.): Frederick Ackerley
1949–4 July 1956 (d.): Thomas Williams
1956–1972 (ret.): Arthur Sephton (afterwards archdeacon emeritus)
1972–16 June 1977 (d.): Martin Kaye
1977–1986 (ret.): David Rogers
1987–1993 (res.): Brian Smith
1994–2005 (ret.): Malcolm Grundy
2005–20 April 2014: Paul Slater (became Archdeacon of Richmond and Craven)

References

 
Lists of Anglicans
Lists of English people